Sharkolai  (also known as Sharkulai or Sharkūlai) is a large village comprising more than two hundred houses in Mansehra District of Khyber-Pakhtunkhwa province of  Pakistan.

Location 

Sharkolai just one kilometer from the eastern side of the Chattar Plain of the Konsh Valley.

Ethnic groups 

The majority of the clans belong to the Swati tribes, like Arghoshal, Jahangiri tribe, Khazan khels also Khazani, Akhun Khels and Akhund zada, Mandravi and there is also another tribe manshai and Quraish.

References

Populated places in Mansehra District